Kazuyuki Nishizawa (西澤 和之 - Nishizawa Kazuyuki; born October 11, 1967) is a Japanese professional racing driver.

Complete JGTC/Super GT Results 
(key) (Races in bold indicate pole position) (Races in italics indicate fastest lap)

References 

1967 births
Living people
People from Kanagawa Prefecture
Japanese racing drivers
Super GT drivers
24 Hours of Le Mans drivers